are presented annually since 1991.

As with the New York Film Critics Circle Awards and Los Angeles Film Critics Association Awards, the selection committee consists of film critics.

Award winners

1990s 
1991 (1st Japanese Movie Critics Awards)
 Best Picture: My Sons (Director: Yoji Yamada)
 Best Director: Naoto Takenaka
 Best Actor: Rentarō Mikuni
 Best Actress: Yuki Kudō
 Best Newcomer: Shinsuke Shimada
 Special Award: 
 Platinum Award: Keisuke Kinoshita

1992
 Best Picture: Seishun Dendekeke Desdeke
 Best Director: Kaneto Shindo
 Best Actor: Takehiro Murata
 Best Actress: Yoshiko Mita

1993
 Best Picture: To Die at the Hospital
 Best Director: Kōichi Saitō
 Best Actor: Ken Tanaka
 Best Actress: Kyōko Kagawa, Emi Wakui, Junko Ikeuchi

1994
 Best Picture: A Dedicated Life
 Best Director: Tatsumi Kumashiro, Ryūichi Hiroki
 Best Actor: Eiji Okuda
 Best Actress: Tomoko Yamaguchi

1995
 Best Picture: A Last Note
 Best Director: Makoto Shīna
 Best Actor: Eiji Okuda
 Best Actress: Kumiko Akiyoshi

1996
 Best Picture: Village of Dreams
 Best Director: Yoshimitsu Morita
 Best Actor: Kōji Yakusho
 Best Actress: Mieko Harada
 Best Newcomer: Masanobu Andō

1997
 Best Picture: Moonlight Serenade
 Best Director: Masahiro Shinoda
 Best Actor: Akira Emoto
 Best Actress: Kyōka Suzuki 

1998
 Best Picture: Kizuna
 Best Director: Takeshi Kitano
 Best Actor: Ken Watanabe
 Best Actress: Takako Matsu

1999
 Best Picture: Coquille
 Best Director: Masahiro Shinoda, Nagisa Oshima
 Best Actor: Tomokazu Miura
 Best Actress: Jun Fubuki, Kyōka Suzuki

2000s 
2000
 Best Picture: Zawazawa ShimoKitazawa
 Best Director: Ryūichi Hiroki, Kazuo Kuroki
 Best Actor: Yoshio Harada
 Best Actress: Hitomi Kuroki

2001
 Best Picture: Black Summer in Japan: False Charges
 Best Director: Isao Yukisada
 Best Actor: Yōsuke Kubozuka
 Best Actress: Yui Natsukawa
 Best Supporting Actor: Tarō Yamamoto
 Best Supporting Actress: Mitsuko Baisho, Sayoko Ninomiya

2002
 Best Picture: KT
 Best Director: Yoichi Sai
 Best Actor: Kōichi Satō, Masaya Kato
 Best Actress: Rie Miyazawa
 Best Supporting Actor: Ryo Ishibashi
 Best Supporting Actress: Kyōko Kagawa

2003
 Best Picture: Lord of the Warabi
 Best Director: Toyohisa Araki
 Best Actor: Masahiko Tsugawa
 Best Actress: Shinobu Terajima, Yūko Takeuchi
 Best Supporting Actor: Ken Watanabe, Teruyuki Kagawa
 Best Supporting Actress: Hitomi Nakahara

2004
 Best Picture: Swing Girls
 Best Director: Nobuhiko Obayashi
 Best Actor: Ken Matsudaira
 Best Actress: Kumiko Akiyoshi
 Best Supporting Actor: Masaya Takahashi
 Best Supporting Actress: Anna Tsuchiya
 Rookie of the Year: Kamiki Ryunosuke 

2005
 Best Picture: Curtain Call
 Best Director: Mitsuo Kurotsuchi
 Best Actor: Kataoka Ainosuke VI, Ichikawa Somegorō VII
 Best Actress: Yūko Tanaka
 Best Supporting Actor: Takashi Sasano, Sansei Shiomi
 Best Supporting Actress: Haruka Igawa

2006
 Best Picture: The Professor's Beloved Equation
 Best Director: Eiji Okuda
 Best Actor: Kenji Sawada
 Best Actress: Eri Fukatsu
 Best Supporting Actor: Tsuyoshi Ihara
 Best Supporting Actress: Kirin Kiki, Hula Girls

2007
 Best Picture: Town of Evening Calm, Country of Cherry Blossoms
 Best Director: Kichitaro Negishi
 Best Actor: Shun Oguri
 Best Actress: Yūko Takeuchi
 Best Supporting Actor: Kyosuke Yabe
 Best Supporting Actress: Hiromi Nagasaku, Keiko Takahashi

2008
 Best Picture: United Red Army
 Best Director: Yōjirō Takita
 Best Actor: Noriyuki Higashiyama
 Best Actress: Eiko Koike
 Best Supporting Actor: Ittoku Kishibe
 Best Supporting Actress: Maki Sakai

2009
 Best Picture: Feel the Wind
 Best Director: Kichitaro Negishi
 Best Actor: Akira Terao
 Best Actress: Hiroko Yakushimaru
 Best Supporting Actor: Renji Ishibashi
 Best Supporting Actress: Kaoru Yachigusa

2010s 
2010
 Best Picture: Haru's Journey
 Best Director: Yōichi Higashi
 Best Actor: Dai Watanabe, Masatoshi Nagase
 Best Actress: Yuki Uchida, Hiromi Nagasaku
 Best Supporting Actor: Teruyuki Kagawa, Yūsuke Iseya
 Best Supporting Actress: Keiko Matsuzaka

2011
 Best Picture: Someday
 Best Director: Izuru Narushima
 Best Actor: Tomokazu Miura
 Best Actress: Shinobu Otake
 Best Supporting Actor: Kataoka Ainosuke VI
 Best Supporting Actress: Nobuko Miyamoto

2012
 Best Picture: Key of Life
 Best Director: Takeshi Kitano
 Best Animation Feature Film: Wolf Children
 Best Animation Director: Hideaki Anno
 Best Actor: Tori Matsuzaka
 Best Actress: Sakura Ando
 Best Supporting Actor: Takao Osawa
 Best Supporting Actress: Chieko Matsubara

2013
 Best Picture: The Great Passage
 Best Director: Keisuke Yoshida
 Best Animation Feature Film: The Tale of the Princess Kaguya
 Best Animation Director: Isao Takahata 
 Best Actor: Ryuhei Matsuda
 Best Actress: Kumiko Asō
 Best Supporting Actor: Lily Franky
 Best Supporting Actress: Ran Ito

2014
 Best Picture: 0.5 mm
 Best Director: Mipo O
 Best Animation Feature Film: Expelled from Paradise
 Best Animation Director: Hiromasa Yonebayashi
 Best Actor: Gō Ayano
 Best Actress: Sakura Ando
 Best Supporting Actor: Masaki Suda
 Best Supporting Actress: Chizuru Ikewaki

2015
 Best Picture: Solomon's Perjury
 Best Director: Hitoshi Ōne
 Best Animation Feature Film: The Boy and the Beast
 Best Animation Director: Masakazu Hashimoto
 Best Actor: Tadanobu Asano
 Best Actress: Mikako Tabe
 Best Supporting Actor: Atsushi Itō
 Best Supporting Actress: Hikari Mitsushima

2016
 Best Picture: Her Love Boils Bathwater
 Best Director: Ryōta Nakano
 Best Animation Feature Film: A Silent Voice
 Best Animation Director: Makoto Shinkai
 Best Actor: Kaoru Kobayashi
 Best Actress: Rie Miyazawa
 Best Supporting Actor: Masahiro Higashide
 Best Supporting Actress: Hana Sugisaki

2017
 Best Picture: The Third Murder
 Best Director: Nobuhiko Obayashi
 Best Animation Feature Film: Night Is Short, Walk On Girl
 Best Animation Director: 
 Best Actor: Takuya Kimura
 Best Actress: Hikari Mitsushima
 Best Supporting Actor: Sansei Shiomi
 Best Supporting Actress: Tae Kimura

2018
 Best Picture: Yakiniku Doragon
 Best Director: Kazuya Shiraishi
 Best Animation Feature Film: Okko's Inn
 Best Animation Director: 
 Best Actor: Tasuku Emoto
 Best Actress: Shizuka Ishibashi
 Best Supporting Actor: Kan'ichiro Sato
 Best Supporting Actress: Tomochika

2019
 Best Picture: Just Only Love
 Best Director: Haruhiko Arai
 Best Animation Feature Film: Sumikko Gurashi The Movie - The Pop-up Book and the Secret Child
 Best Animation Director: 
 Best Actor: Shotaro Mamiya
 Best Actress: Erika Toda
 Best Supporting Actor: Yōsuke Kubozuka
 Best Supporting Actress: Sairi Ito

2020
 Best Picture: Child of the Stars
 Best Director: Akiko Oku
 Best Animation Feature Film: GON, THE LITTLE FOX -
 Best Animation Director: 
 Best Actor: Nakamura Baijaku II, Kanji Tsuda
 Best Actress: Non
 Best Supporting Actor: Shohei Uno
 Best Supporting Actress: Miyoko Asada

External links 
  
 Official website (old) 
 19th Japan Movie Critics Awards ceremony (video digest) 

Japanese film awards
Awards established in 1991
1991 establishments in Japan
Annual events in Japan
Recurring events established in 1991